"My Man" is a 1982 single by Yoko Ono from the album It's Alright (I See Rainbows) in a new wave/calypso style. "Let the Tears Dry" appeared on the B-side. The song was originally written in 1980.

Yoko wrote about the song when it was included on her 1992 boxset Onobox:

Cash Box said that it is one of Ono's catchiest pop songs.  Billboard recommended it.

Ultimate Classic Rock critic Michael Gallucci rated it as Ono's 8th best song.

References

Yoko Ono songs
1982 singles
Song recordings produced by Yoko Ono
Songs written by Yoko Ono
1982 songs
Polydor Records singles